Savage Mountain is an anticline extending from Bedford County, Pennsylvania southwest into Western Maryland.  It is the western side of the Ridge-and-Valley Appalachians, and the eastern portion of the ridge forms the border of Garrett and Allegany Counties of Maryland.

The anti-cline includes two parallel component ridges: Little Savage Mountain to the west and Big Savage Mountain to the east.  Little Savage Mountain becomes Allegheny Mountain to the north at a saddle near Meyersdale, while Big Savage Mountain becomes Backbone Mountain to the south at the Savage River Reservoir.

Portions of Savage Mountain form the Eastern Continental Divide, separating watersheds draining to the Ohio River and those draining to the Potomac.  To the northwest of Savage Mountain, waters drain to the Casselman River.  The North Branch Potomac River watershed encompasses the southwestern and eastern portions of the ridge.

History
After Nemacolin's Path and the first survey of the Potomac (1736-1737) had passed through the area, the Braddock Road over the ridge opened in 1757.  By 1767, the Mason–Dixon line survey had placed milestones across the ridge and the National Road was completed through the area by 1818.

In 1911, construction began on the Borden and Big Savage Tunnels for the Connellsville subdivision of the Western Maryland Railway. In the 1930s, the Civilian Conservation Corps built a connection road that is now the 6.4 mile Monroe Run Trail.

The Savage River Dam and Reservoir were constructed just southwest of the ridge in 1952 to control flooding along the Savage River and North Branch Potomac River, as well as to supply water to nearby communities.

On August 13, 1976, the freeway that would become Interstate 68 opened through the ridge. Due to severe fog conditions common along this stretch of highway, Maryland's first "fog warning system" was installed after a May 2003 crash that killed two and injured about 100 people.

In 2001, the fire history and dendroecology of Savage Mountain oak stands were investigated. About 2,600 trees were later planted in the Savage Mountain Demonstration Plot #2 in 2007.

Wind power
In 2006, U.S. WindForce proposed a wind farm on Savage Mountain at a strip-mining site. A study for the Savage Mountain Transmission Main Project began in 2008.

Notable points

References

See also
Eastern Continental Divide
Georges Creek Valley
K2 (sometimes called "the Savage Mountain")

Allegheny Mountains
Ridges of Maryland
Ridges of Pennsylvania
Landforms of Allegany County, Maryland
Landforms of Garrett County, Maryland
Landforms of Somerset County, Pennsylvania